Trypanaeinae is a subfamily of clown beetles in the family Histeridae. There are at least 3 genera and more than 70 described species in Trypanaeinae.

Genera
These three genera belong to the subfamily Trypanaeinae:
 Coptotrophis Lewis, 1902
 Trypanaeus Eschscholtz, 1829
 Xylonaeus Lewis, 1902

References

Further reading

 
 
 
 
 
 

Histeridae